The puff adder (Bitis arietans) is a viper species found in savannahs and grasslands from Morocco and western Arabia throughout Africa except for the Sahara and rainforest regions. It is responsible for causing the most snakebite fatalities in Africa owing to various factors, such as its wide distribution, frequent occurrence in highly populated regions, and aggressive disposition. Like all other vipers, it is venomous. Two subspecies are currently recognized, including the nominate subspecies described here.

The species is commonly known as the puff adder, African puff adder, or common puff adder.

Taxonomy
German naturalist Blasius Merrem described the puff adder in 1820. The word arietans means "striking violently" and is derived from the Latin arieto. The type locality given is "Promontorio bonae spei" (Cape of Good Hope), South Africa.

Subspecies

Description
The snake's typical size is about 1.0 m (39.3 in) in total length (body and tail) and very stout. Large specimens of 190 cm (75 in) total length, weighing over 6.0 kg (13.2 lb) and with a girth of 40 cm (16 in) have been reported. Males are usually larger than females and have relatively longer tails.

The color pattern varies geographically. The head has two well-marked dark bands - one on the crown and the other between the eyes. On the sides of the head, two oblique, dark bands or bars run from the eye to the supralabials. Below, the head is yellowish white with scattered dark blotches. Iris color ranges from gold to silver-gray. Dorsally, the ground color varies from straw yellow, to light brown, to orange or reddish brown. This is overlaid with a pattern of 18–22 backwardly directed, dark brown to black bands that extend down the back and tail. Usually, these bands are roughly chevron-shaped, but may be more U-shaped in some areas. They also form two to six light-and-dark cross-bands on the tail. Some populations are heavily flecked with brown and black, often obscuring other coloration, giving the animal a dusty-brown or blackish appearance. The belly is yellow or white, with a few scattered dark spots. Newborn young have golden head markings with pinkish to reddish ventral plates toward the lateral edges.
One unusual specimen, described by Branch and Farrell (1988), from Summer Pride, East London, in South Africa, was striped. The pattern consisted of a narrow (one scale wide), pale yellowish stripe that ran from the crown of the head to the tip of the tail.
Generally, though, these are relatively dull-looking snakes, except for male specimens from highland East Africa and the Western Cape province of South Africa, that usually have a striking yellow-and-black color pattern.

Puff adders have a form of olfactory crypsis which has been shown to make detecting them difficult for trained dogs and meerkats, both scent-based predators. The exact nature of this ability is not known, but is hypothesized to be related to a low metabolic rate, as well as relocation after shedding and defecating.

Scalation

The head has a less than triangular shape with a blunt and rounded snout. Still, the head is much wider than the neck. The rostral scale is small. The circumorbital ring consists of 10–16 scales. Across the top of the head, there are 7–11 interocular scales; three or four scales separate the suboculars and the supralabials. It has 12 to 17 supralabials and 13–17 sublabials. The first three or four sublabials contact the chin shields, of which only one pair exists.

Midbody, the snake has 29–41 rows of dorsal scales. These are strongly keeled except for the outermost rows. The ventral scale count is 123–147, the subcaudals number 14–38. Females have no more than 24 subcaudals. The anal scale is single.

Distribution and habitat
This species may be the most common and widespread snake in Africa. It is found in most of sub-Saharan Africa south to the Cape of Good Hope, including southern Morocco, Mauritania, Senegal, Mali, southern Algeria, Guinea, Sierra Leone, Côte d'Ivoire, Ghana, Togo, Benin, Niger, Nigeria, Chad, Sudan, Cameroon, the Central African Republic, northern, eastern, and southern Democratic Republic of the Congo, Uganda, Kenya, Somalia, Rwanda, Burundi, Tanzania, Angola, Zambia, Malawi, Mozambique, Zimbabwe, Botswana, Namibia, and South Africa. It also occurs on the Arabian Peninsula, where it is found in southwestern Saudi Arabia and Yemen.

It is found in all habitats except true deserts, rainforests, and (tropical) alpine habitats. It is most often associated with rocky grasslands. It is not found in rainforest areas, such as along the coast of West Africa and in Central Africa (i.e., central DR Congo); it is also absent from the Mediterranean coastal region of North Africa. On the Arabian Peninsula, it is found as far north as Ta'if. It has been reported to be found in the Dhofar region of southern Oman.

Behaviour

Normally a sluggish species, the puff adder relies on camouflage for protection. Locomotion is primarily rectilinear, using the broad ventral scales in a caterpillar fashion and aided by its own weight for traction. When agitated, it can resort to a typical serpentine movement of surprising speed.
Although mainly terrestrial, these snakes are good swimmers and can also climb with ease; often they are found basking in low bushes. One specimen was found 4.6 m above the ground in a densely branched tree.

If disturbed, they  hiss loudly and continuously, adopting a tightly coiled defensive posture with the forepart of their body held in a taut "S" shape. At the same time, they may attempt to back away from the threat towards cover. They may strike suddenly and fast, to the side as easily as forwards, before returning quickly to the defensive position, ready to strike again. During a strike, the force of the impact is so strong, and the long fangs penetrate so deeply, that prey items are often killed by the physical trauma alone. The fangs apparently can penetrate soft leather.

They can strike to a distance of about one-third of their body length, but juveniles can launch their entire bodies forwards in the process. These snakes rarely grip their victims, but instead release quickly to return to the striking position.

Feeding
Mostly nocturnal, they rarely forage actively, preferring, instead, to ambush prey as it happens by. Their prey includes mammals, birds, amphibians, and lizards.

Reproduction
 Females produce a pheromone to attract males, which engage in neck-wrestling combat dances. A female in Malindi was followed by seven males. They give birth to large numbers of offspring; litters over 80 have been reported, while 50–60 are not unusual. Newborns are 12.5–17.5 cm in length. Very large specimens, particularly those from East Africa, give birth to the highest numbers of offspring. A Kenyan female in a Czech zoo gave birth to 156 young, the largest litter for any species of snake.

Captivity
These snakes do well in captivity, but  gluttony has been reported. Kauffeld (1969) mentions that specimens can be maintained for years on only one meal per week, but that when offered all they can eat, the result is often death, or at best wholesale regurgitation. They are bad-tempered snakes, and some specimens never settle down in captivity, always hissing and puffing when approached.

Venom
This species is responsible for more snakebite fatalities than any other African snake, due to a combination of factors, including its wide distribution, common occurrence, large size, potent venom that is produced in large amounts, long fangs, and their habit of basking by footpaths and sitting quietly when approached.

The venom has cytotoxic effects and is one of the most toxic of any vipers based on LD50. The  values in mice vary: 0.4–2.0 mg/kg intravenously, 0.9–3.7 mg/kg peritoneally, and 4.4–7.7 mg/kg subcutaneously (SC). Mallow et al. (2003) give an LD50 range of 1.0–7.75 mg/kg SC. Venom yield is typically 150–350 mg, with a maximum of 750 mg. Brown (1973) mentions a venom yield of 180–750 mg. About 100 mg are thought to be enough to kill a healthy adult human male, with death occurring after 25 hours.

In humans, bites from this species can produce severe local and systemic symptoms. Based on the degree and type of local effect, bites can be divided into two symptomatic categories - those with little or no surface extravasation, and those with hemorrhages evident as ecchymosis, bleeding, and swelling. In both cases, severe pain and tenderness occur, but in the latter, widespread superficial or deep necrosis and compartment syndrome are seen. Serious bites cause limbs to become immovably flexed as a result of significant hemorrhage or coagulation in the affected muscles. Residual induration, however, is rare and usually these areas completely resolve.

Other bite symptoms that may occur in humans include edema, which may become extensive, shock, watery blood oozing from the puncture wounds, nausea and vomiting, subcutaneous bruising, blood blisters that may form rapidly, and  painful swelling of the regional lymph nodes. Swelling usually decreases after a few days, except for the area immediately around the bite site. Hypotension, together with weakness, dizziness, and periods of semi- or unconsciousness is also reported.

If not treated carefully, necrosis will spread, causing skin, subcutaneous tissue, and muscle to separate from healthy tissue and eventually slough with serous exudate. The slough may be superficial or deep, sometimes down to the bone. Gangrene and secondary infections commonly occur and can result in loss of digits and limbs.

The fatality rate highly depends on the severity of the bites and some other factors. Deaths can be exceptional and probably occur in less than 15% of all untreated cases (usually in 2–4 days from complications following blood volume deficit and disseminated intravascular coagulation), although some reports show that severe envenomations have a 52% mortality rate.
Most fatalities are associated with poor clinical management and neglect.

References

Further reading

Access Professional Development. 2022. Puff Adder (Bitis arietans). [Online] Available: https://accesspd.co.za/species/PuffAdder (Accessed: 02/02/2022)
Boulenger GA. 1896. Catalogue of the Snakes in the British Museum (Natural History). Volume III., Containing the...Viperidæ. London: Trustees of the British Museum (Natural History). (Taylor and Francis, printers.) xiv + 727 pp. + Plates I.- XXV. (Bitis arietans, pp. 493–495.)
Branch, Bill. 2004. Field Guide to Snakes and Other Reptiles of Southern Africa. Third Revised edition, Second impression. Sanibel Island, Florida: Ralph Curtis Books. 399 pp. . (Bitis arietans, pp. 114–115 + Plates 3, 12.)
Broadley DG, Cock EV. 1975. Snakes of Rhodesia. Zimbabwe: Longman Zimbabwe Ltd. 97 pp.
Broadley DG. 1990. FitzSimons' Snakes of Southern Africa. Parklands (South Africa): J Ball & AD Donker Publishers. 387 pp.
Merrem B. 1820. Versuch eines Systems der Amphibien: Tentamen Systematis Amphibiorum. J.C. Krieger. Marburg. xv + 191 pp. + 1 plate. ("Vipera. Echidna. arietans", p. 152.)
Pienaar U de V. 1978. The reptile fauna of Kruger National Park. National Parks Board of South Africa. 19 pp.
Sweeney RCH. 1961. Snakes of Nyasaland. Zomba, Nyasaland: The Nyasaland Society and Nyasaland Government. 74 pp.
Turner RM. 1972. Snake bite treatment. Black Lechwe 10 (3): 24–33.

External links

  Accessed 9 December 2006.
 . Accessed 1 March 2007.
 Image of B. arietans bite that resulted in fasciotomy at South African Vaccine Producers. Accessed 26 July 2008.
Birds mob Puff Adder  - paper in ejournal Ornithological Observations

Bitis
Snakes of Africa
Reptiles of North Africa
Reptiles of Ethiopia
Reptiles of Uganda
Reptiles described in 1820
Taxa named by Blasius Merrem
Articles containing video clips